The 2009 Indian general election polls in United Andhra Pradesh were held for 42 seats in the state. The major contenders in the polls were the Third Front, Indian National Congress and Praja Rajyam. The assembly elections were held simultaneously with the general elections in the state.

Telugu Desam Party (TDP) left the National Democratic Alliance (NDA) after the losses in 2004, and now joined the Third Front. Telangana Rashtra Samithi who were part of the UPA, in the 2004 election, also now allied with the Third Front. But after voting took place in Andhra Pradesh, and before votes were counted, the TRS joined the NDA.  These were the first elections for the movie star Chiranjeevi led Praja Rajyam.

The results were a repeat of the last election, where the Indian National Congress and the UPA, won 34 out of 42 seats, resulting in a landslide victory. The popularity of Chief Minister Rajasekhar Reddy earned him a landslide victory in the national election and winning his re-election, in the state election.

Voting and results

Results by alliance

List of elected members

References

External links 
 Website of Election Commission of India
 CNN-IBN Lok Sabha Election History

Indian general elections in Andhra Pradesh
2000s in Andhra Pradesh
Andhra